Sunčane Skale 2014 was the twentieth edition of Sunčane Skale, an annual pop festival held in Montenegro.

Results

Nove zvijezde

20 years of the festival
One day after Nove zvijezde (on 3 July 2014) it was held an interval event as a celebration of 20 years of the festival, where the biggest pop stars (who participated in the festival) performed.

Scoreboard

References

External links 

Sunčane Skale
2014 in Montenegro